Luis Vega may refer to:

 Little Louie Vega (born 1965), American DJ, record producer and remixer
 Luis Vega Torres (born 1998), Cuban swimmer
 Luis Calderón Vega (1911–1989), Mexican politician and writer
 Luis Vega (mathematician) (born 1960), Spanish mathematician
 Luis de Vega, 16th-century Spanish architect
 Luis Lasso de la Vega, 17th-century Mexican priest and lawyer
 Luis Vega De Castro (born 1944), Cuban artist
 Luis Vega Ramos (born 1970), Puerto Rican lawyer and politician
 Luis Vega (footballer) (born 2002), Honduran footballer